Charaxes hildebrandti, the Hildebrandt's charaxes, is a butterfly in the family Nymphalidae. It is found in Sierra Leone, Ivory Coast, Ghana, Nigeria, Cameroon, Gabon, the Republic of the Congo, Angola, the Central African Republic, the Democratic Republic of the Congo, Uganda and Zambia. It is a rare and local species

Description
Ch. hildebrandti Dew. male : wings above black with a common, straight, white, bluish-bordered 
transverse band, extending from vein 2 on the hindwing to vein 7 or 8 on the forewing, but in cellules 5—8 of the forewing broken up into small, rounded spots; tails of the hindwing short and obtuse. The white transverse band occurs beneath also and is here basally bounded on the hindwing by the fine, continuous and nearly straight black discal line, but on the forewing in cellules lb—3 proximally often angled at the veins so as to form a series of steps. Hindwing beneath with yellowish marginal line. The female is somewhat larger than the male and has the white transverse band broader and scarcely margined with blue, reaching the inner margin of the hindwing; otherwise it agrees with the male. Gold Coast to Angola.

Biology
Its habitat consists of lowland evergreen forests.

The larvae feed on Dyboscia species.

Subspecies
Charaxes hildebrandti hildebrandti (Nigeria, Cameroon, Gabon, Congo, northern Angola, Central African Republic, northern and central Democratic Republic of the Congo, western Uganda)
Charaxes hildebrandti gillesi Plantrou, 1973  (Sierra Leone, Ivory Coast, Ghana, western Nigeria)
Charaxes hildebrandti katangensis Talbot, 1928 (eastern and southern Democratic Republic of the Congo, north-western Zambia, Uganda: west to the Bwamba Valley)

Taxonomy
Charaxes hildebrandti is a member of the large species group Charaxes etheocles.

Realm
Afrotropical realm

Etymology
The name honours Johann Maria Hildebrandt.

References

Victor Gurney Logan Van Someren, 1972 Revisional notes on African Charaxes (Lepidoptera: Nymphalidae). Part VIII. Bulletin of the British Museum (Natural History) (Entomology)215-264.

External links
Charaxes hildebrandti images at Consortium for the Barcode of Life
Charaxes hildebrandti hildebrandti images at BOLD
Charaxes hildebrandti gillesi images at BOLD
Charaxes hildebrandti katangensis images at BOLD holotype
Images of C. hildebrandti hildebrandti Royal Museum for Central Africa (Albertine Rift Project)
Images of C. hildebrandti katangensis (Albertine Rift Project)

Butterflies described in 1879
hildebrandti
Butterflies of Africa
Taxa named by Hermann Dewitz